Sunnyslope is an unincorporated community in Canyon County in the southwestern part of the U.S. state of Idaho.

The community is known as a center of the Snake River Valley AVA with 14 area wineries making up the Sunnyslope Wine Trail.

Idaho State Highway 55 runs through the community.

References

External links
Sunnyslope Wine Trail

Unincorporated communities in Canyon County, Idaho
Unincorporated communities in Idaho
Boise metropolitan area